Eremiaphila petiti is a species of praying mantis found in Egypt.

See also
List of mantis genera and species

References

Eremiaphila
Mantodea of Africa
Insects described in 1835